Central National Bank Building may refer to:

Central National Bank Building (Peoria, Illinois)
Central National Bank (Topeka, Kansas), listed on the National Register of Historic Places (NRHP) in Shawnee County, Kansas
Central National Tower, Battle Creek, Michigan, listed on the NRHP in Calhoun County, Michigan
McDonald Investment Center, in Cleveland, Ohio, formerly known as Central National Bank Building
Central National Bank (Alva, Oklahoma)
Central National Bank (Richmond, Virginia)
Central National Bank (Washington, D.C.)

See also
Central National Bank (disambiguation)
FirstMerit Tower, Akron, Ohio, also known as the First National Bank Building or the First Central Trust Building